Beloved Augustin is a 1940 historical drama film directed by E. W. Emo and starring Paul Hörbiger, Michael Bohnen, and Hilde Weissner.

The film's sets were designed by the art directors Karl Haacker and Karl Weber. It was shot on location in Vienna.

Cast

References

External links

Films of Nazi Germany
German historical films
1940s historical films
Films set in Vienna
Films set in the 1680s
Films directed by E. W. Emo
Terra Film films
German black-and-white films
Biographical films about musicians
Cultural depictions of Austrian men
Cultural depictions of folk musicians
1940s German films